Glen Thomson (born 12 July 1973 in Dunedin, New Zealand) is a New Zealand racing cyclist. He won a gold medal at the 1998 Commonwealth Games in the men's points race, previously at the 1994 Commonwealth Games in Victoria, British Columbia, Canada he won a bronze medal as part of the men's team pursuit riding alongside Brendon Cameron, Julian Dean and Lee Vertongen. In 2000 he began racing on the professional cycling circuit, winning the 176km New Zealand National Road Championship.  From 2005 to 2019 he ran the Cycle Surgery franchise in Invercargill, New Zealand and in February 2019 joined Cycling Southland in Invercargill as development and events co-ordinator. In 2020 Thomson was accepted to the Academy Southland Performance Coach Programme.

References

Cyclists at the 2000 Summer Olympics
New Zealand male cyclists
Olympic cyclists of New Zealand
Commonwealth Games gold medallists for New Zealand
Commonwealth Games bronze medallists for New Zealand
Cyclists at the 1994 Commonwealth Games
Cyclists at the 1998 Commonwealth Games
New Zealand track cyclists
1973 births
Living people
Sportspeople from Dunedin
Commonwealth Games medallists in cycling
Medallists at the 1994 Commonwealth Games
Medallists at the 1998 Commonwealth Games